The following radio stations broadcast on FM frequency 97.9 MHz:

Argentina
 Activa in Adolfo Gonzales Chaves, Buenos Aires
 ADN in Rafaela, Santa Fe
 Altos in Bahía Blanca, Buenos Aires
 Cultura in Buenos Aires
 Destino in J. Gorina, Buenos Aires
 Fenix in Formosa
 La Costa in Necochea, Buenos Aires
 La 100 Neuquén in Neuquén
 LRS313 Génesis in San Jerónimo Norte, Santa Fe 
 Open Radio in Buena Esperanza, San Luis
 Radio María in Santo Tomé, Corrientes
 Tartago in Tartagal, Salta
 Universidad in Villa Mercedes, San Luis 
 Vida in Rosario, Santa Fe
 Villa Trinidad in Villa Trinidad, Santa Fe
 Mitre Córdoba in Córdoba

Australia
 2LVR in Parkes, New South Wales
 979fm in Melton, Victoria
 ABC Classic FM in Grafton, New South Wales
 ABC Classic FM in Alice Springs, Northern Territory
 ABC Classic FM in Mackay, Queensland
 Hit97.9 Kalgoorlie in Kalgoorlie, Western Australia
 3SEA in Latrobe Valley, Victoria
 3RMR in Mildura, Victoria

Canada (Channel 250)
 CBAA-FM in Allardville, New Brunswick
 CBCD-FM-1 in Deep River, Ontario
 CBON-FM-11 in Dubreuilville, Ontario
 CBRC-FM in Harvie Heights, Alberta
 CBRJ-FM in Phoenix, British Columbia
 CBWV-FM in Brandon, Manitoba
 CFDL-FM in Deer Lake, Newfoundland and Labrador
 CFLC-FM in Churchill Falls, Newfoundland and Labrador
 CFLN-FM in Goose Bay, Newfoundland and Labrador
 CFNN-FM in St. Anthony, Newfoundland and Labrador
 CFPS-FM in Port Elgin, Ontario
 CHSR-FM in Fredericton, New Brunswick
 CILM-FM in Truro, Nova Scotia
 CINY-FM in Inukjuak, Quebec
 CIRL-FM in Southend, Saskatchewan
 CJCQ-FM in North Battleford, Saskatchewan
 CJLL-FM in Ottawa, Ontario
 CJNC-FM in Norway House, Manitoba
 CJRG-FM-3 in Riviere-au-Renard, Quebec
 CKCJ-FM in Lebel-sur-Quévillon, Quebec
 CKWB-FM in Westlock, Alberta
 CKYX-FM in Fort McMurray, Alberta
 VF2099 in Fort St. James, British Columbia
 VF2142 in Uranium City, Saskatchewan
 VF2410 in Rankin Inlet, Nunavut
 VF2492 in Campement Eastmain, Quebec

China 
 CNR The Voice of China in Yingkou
 CNR Business Radio in Hagnzhou

Indonesia
 FeMale Radio in Jakarta

Malaysia
 Raaga in Ipoh, Perak

Mexico
 XETIA-FM in Guadalajara, Jalisco
 XHEBC-FM in Ensenada, Baja California
 XHEON-FM in Torreón, Coahuila
 XHMJ-FM in Piedras Negras, Coahuila
 XHMMS-FM in Mazatlán, Sinaloa
 XHMX-FM in Tapachula, Chiapas
 XHPXA-FM in San Miguel Xaltepec, Puebla
 XHQTO-FM in Querétaro, Querétaro
 XHSCGL-FM in Jalapa, Tabasco
 XHTRES-FM in Tres Valles, Veracruz
 XHUHV-FM in Chicontepec, Veracruz
 XHZH-FM in Zacatecas, Zacatecas

Philippines

DWQZ in Pasig
DYBU-FM in Cebu City
DXSS in Davao City
DXCM-FM in Zamboanga City

United Kingdom
 BBC Radio 1 in Angus, East Ayrshire, Isle of Lewis, Millburn Muir, Shetland, Snowdonia, South Newry, Trowbridge, Ullapool, W. Midlands, Wensleydale, Windermere

United States (Channel 250)
 KARW in Salinas, California
 KBFB in Dallas, Texas
 KBNX in Bangs, Texas
 KBOG-LP in Bandon, Oregon
  in Sikeston, Missouri
 KBXX in Houston, Texas
  in Ogden, Utah
 KCJV-LP in Leon Springs, Texas
  in Mason City, Iowa
  in Lolo, Montana
 KEAA-LP in Eagle, Alaska
 KEFE-LP in Lakeville, Minnesota
 KFBD-FM in Waynesville, Missouri
 KFCC-LP in Mission, Texas
  in Fargo, North Dakota
  in Amarillo, Texas
  in Palmyra, Missouri
  in Cortez, Colorado
  in Cache, Oklahoma
  in Hilo, Hawaii
 KKTT-LP in Winnemucca, Nevada
  in East Los Angeles, California
 KLLG-LP in Willits, California
 KLMG in Esparto, California
  in Needles, California
 KLVP in Aloha, Oregon
 KMAI-LP in Alturas, California
  in Fresno, California
 KNSL in Lamoni, Iowa
 KODM in Odessa, Texas
  in Crescent City, California
 KPXP in Garapan-Saipan, Northern Mariana Islands
  in Boise, Idaho
  in De Ridder, Louisiana
 KQSA in Batesville, Texas
 KRBB in Wichita, Kansas
 KSEZ in Sioux City, Iowa
  in Cody, Wyoming
 KTLO-FM in Mountain Home, Arkansas
 KTMN in Cloudcroft, New Mexico
  in Tempe, Arizona
 KVGK-LP in Las Vegas, Nevada
 KVPC in Rapid City, South Dakota
  in Dutton, Montana
 KWGB in Colby, Kansas
 KXAF in George West, Texas
  in Cheyenne, Wyoming
  in Webb City, Missouri
 KYYR-LP in Yakima, Washington
  in Poteau, Oklahoma
  in Milton-Freewater, Oregon
 KZWB in Green River, Wyoming
 WALW-LP in Moulton, Alabama
  in Heyworth, Illinois
  in Crisfield, Maryland
  in Hazleton, Pennsylvania
 WBYJ-LP in Burlington, North Carolina
 WCCV-LP in Williamsburg, Massachusetts
 WCKL in Chicago, Illinois
  in Wiggins, Mississippi
  in Ambrose, Georgia
  in Eveleth, Minnesota
 WGJM-LP in Englewood, Ohio
  in Anderson, Indiana
  in Charlotte Amalie, Virgin Islands
  in Grand Rapids, Michigan
 WHAV-LP in Haverhill, Massachusetts
  in Fort Valley, Georgia
 WIBT in Greenville, Mississippi
  in Newberry, Michigan
  in Blackville, South Carolina
 WIYY in Baltimore, Maryland
  in Portland, Maine
 WJLB in Detroit, Michigan
 WJOF-LP in Liberty, North Carolina
  in Wetumpka, Alabama
 WKKW in Fairmont, West Virginia
 WKSL in Neptune Beach, Florida
 WKZB (FM) in Newton, Mississippi
 WLHR-LP in Maryville, Tennessee
  in Kenova, West Virginia
  in Bayboro, North Carolina
 WNCI in Columbus, Ohio
 WOFB-LP in Greeneville, Tennessee
  in Concord, North Carolina
  in Rochester, New York
 WREN-LP in Charlottesville, Virginia
 WRGE-LP in Ocala, Florida
  in Windham, New York
 WRMF in Palm Beach, Florida
  in Nashville, Tennessee
  in New York, New York
  in Whitesboro, New York
  in Salem, Indiana
 WSNO-FM in Au Sable, New York
 WSPT in Stevens Point, Wisconsin
  in Gaston, North Carolina
 WTSM in Woodville, Florida
 WUCS in Windsor Locks, Connecticut
 WUTY-LP in Worcester, Massachusetts
 WVET-LP in Fort McCoy, Florida
  in Oxford, Alabama
 WWGL-LP in Steubenville, Ohio
  in Effingham, Illinois
  in Edinboro, Pennsylvania
 WXTB in Clearwater, Florida
 WXTF-LP in Harrisville, Michigan
 WZFE-LP in Moca, Puerto Rico
 WZQQ in Hyden, Kentucky
 WZZU in Lynchburg, Virginia

References

Lists of radio stations by frequency